Kongsberg Geospatial is a Situational Awareness and Geospatial Visualization software company located in Ottawa, Ontario, Canada. It was founded in 1992 as Gallium Visual Systems Inc. and purchased in 2006 by Norwegian Defence firm Kongsberg Gruppen. It currently operates as a subsidiary of Kongsberg Defence & Aerospace and in 2012, officially changed its name to Kongsberg Gallium Ltd. In 2016, the company changed its name again to Kongsberg Geospatial.

Their current office is located in the Kanata Research Park with many other high tech and IT companies.

Kongsberg Geospatial primarily sells to the defence market, but has also created software for Air Traffic Management, Air Traffic Control Simulation and Training, and Vessel Traffic Management applications. Its primary customers are government and military, or prime contractors.

Products
Kongsberg Geospatial offers a family of software development kit (SDK) products directly to customers or uses them as the basis for turn-key solutions and applications. The company also sells standalone applications for Air Traffic Control training and simulation and for operating Unmanned Aerial Vehicles (UAVs) beyond visual line-of-sight (BVLOS).

TerraLens:
TerraLens (formerly InterMAPhics) was first created in 1992 as one of Gallium Visual Systems first products. It is a software development kit used for the development of custom user interface and real-time mapping applications. It can use a variety of map formats and platforms to provide Situational Awareness and Geospatial Visualization information. The SDK is currently in its 8th generation and is used as the basis of many of the company's applications.

IRIS Terminal
IRIS Terminal is an Airspace Management application created to provide UAV operators with spatial awareness and warning of airspace conflicts when piloting UAVs beyond visual line-of-sight.

InterCOM DDS
Intercom DDS is an open standard middleware for data distribution. It is built to allow developers to define and share real time data across systems, networks, platforms and processors. Kongsberg Geospatial participates in DDS standards groups created by the Object Management Group. As such, InterCOM DDS can be used with any OMG RTPS protocol compliant device.

ISIM
ISIM is an Air Traffic Control Trainer used for Air Traffic Control Training, Air Space Analysis, HMI Development, and UAV integration. It was developed to provide the radar simulation for the US National Airspace System (NAS). It is the only system that uses the same display and user interface as the automation systems in FAA air traffic control centers. It is based on InterMAPhics.

Notable projects

Over 20 years, Kongsberg Geospatial has provided software to a number of projects, including:

Air
U.S. Army Theatre High Altitude Air Defense
Finnish Air Defense System
Polish Coastal Air Defense System
Japanese Ballistic Missile Defense System
NATO Airborne Warning and Control System
NATO Advanced Early Warning & Control System
Triton & Firescout UAV Ground Control Stations
AN/TPS-70 Air Defense Radar System
NASAMS (Norwegian Advanced Surface to Air Missile System)
Drone SAR Canada

Naval
U.S. Navy Aegis
U.S. Navy Littoral Combat Ship
Spanish Navy F105 Aegis
Japanese Aegis Modernization
Canadian Patrol Frigate
Australian Air Warfare Destroyer
Norwegian Ula Class Submarine
Canadian Navy SIRIUS Sensor

Land
Army Battle Management System
USMC AN/TPS-80 Ground / Air Task Oriented Radar
US Army Joint Battle Command Platform
Vehicle Integrated Combat System
Aegis Ashore
Air Traffic Management Systems
Carrier and Amphibious Air Traffic Control System
Nav Canada Canadian Automated Air Traffic System
Raytheon AutoTrac III ATM system
Telephonics Aerotrac ATM System
UK NATS Scottish Oceanic System

Air Traffic Control Simulation and Training
FAA CAMI Advanced ATC Research Simulator
FAA Air Space Design Team
USN Carrier Embedded ATC Trainer 
Community College of Beaver County
Middle Georgia College

Surveillance
Vessel Traffic Management System
Port Surveillance C2 system
Off Shore Oil Field Situational Awareness
PAL Airborne Maritime Patrol System
U.S. Coast Guard National Security Cutter

Community involvement
Kongsberg Geospatial contributes to The Ottawa Hospital, and over the past six years, has  raised over $250,000. In 2014, these efforts resulted in a Best Ottawa Business Award for Philanthropic Initiative of the Year.

Partnership 
In 2019, Kongsberg Geospatial and AiRXOS partner for the management to provide automated, unmanned traffic control systems across essential infrastructure.

In May 2020, Kongsberg Geospatial, Larus Technologies, and the Civil Air Search and Rescue Association of Canada (CASARA) to help establish innovative approaches for drone usage in search and rescue operations in rural areas around Canada leveraging geospatial tools, artificial intelligence, and computer vision softwares.

References

1992 establishments in Ontario
Companies based in Ottawa
Geospatial
Software companies of Canada
Technology companies established in 1992
Geographic data and information companies